USS R-6 (SS-83) was an R-class coastal and harbor defense submarine of the United States Navy.

Construction and commissioning
R-6′s keel was laid down on 17 December 1917 by the Fore River Shipbuilding Company, Quincy, Massachusetts. She was launched on 1 March 1919, sponsored by Ms. Katherine Langdon Hill, and commissioned at Boston, Massachusetts, on 1 May 1919.

1919-1931
After fitting out at Boston, R-6 reported to Submarine Division 9 (SubDiv 9) of the United States Atlantic Fleet at New London, Connecticut, on 16 September 1919. In early December, while anchored alongside the submarine tender  and five other submarines, she was swept away by a gale and grounded on Black Rock at the entrance to the harbor at New London. Once aground, she radioed for help and two minesweepers tried to pull her off the rocks, but to no avail. She was later freed and returned to service.

R-6 got underway on 4 December 1919 for Norfolk, Virginia, and winter exercises with her division in the Gulf of Mexico from 21 January to 14 April 1920. She returned to New London on 18 May 1920 for four months of summer maneuvers before getting underway from New London on 13 September 1920 for Norfolk and overhaul.

With SubDiv 9, R-6, given the hull classification symbol SS-83 on 17 July 1920, was ordered to the United States Pacific Fleet on 11 April 1921;. Under command of Lieutenant Irving W. Chambers, son of retired Captain Washington Irving Chambers, the "Father of Naval Aviation," the submarine transited the Panama Canal on 28 May 1921 and arrived on 30 June 1921 at her new base, San Pedro Submarine Base in San Pedro, California. Due to a malfunction in one of her torpedo tubes, she sank in San Pedro Harbor on 26 September 1921, but was refloated on 13 October 1921 by the submarine  and the minesweeper . From 26 February to 2 March 1923, R-6 was used by Twentieth Century-Fox in making the motion picture The Eleventh Hour.

R-6 was transferred on 16 July 1923 to Hawaii, where she remained for the next seven-and-a-half years engaged in training and operations with fleet units.

R-6 was recalled to the Atlantic on 12 December 1930, transited the Panama Canal on 18 January 1931, and arrived on 9 February 1931 at Philadelphia, Pennsylvania, where she 'decommissioned on 4 May 1931.

1940–1946
Upon recommissioning at New London on 15 November 1940, R-6 was assigned to SubDiv 42 and departed on 10 December 1941 for the submarine base at Coco Solo, Panama Canal Zone, where she remained until 16 June 1941. She was transferred to SubDiv 31 at Saint Thomas, United States Virgin Islands, on 22 June 1941 and operated from there until returning to New London on 8 October 1941 for a refit.

R-6 next joined the anti-U-boat patrol operating roughly on a line between Nantucket, Massachusetts, and Bermuda. Through 1942, she rotated between New London and Bermuda, conducting submerged periscope patrols by day and surface patrols at night to protect coastal traffic. From 1943 to mid-1945, she was employed primarily in training destroyers and destroyer escorts in anti-submarine warfare.

The patrol boat  and boats from Montauk, New York, came to her assistance. R-6 surfaced with no casualties or visible signs of damage and proceeded to port under her own power.

R-6 was involved in testing the U.S. version of the submarine snorkel between April and August 1945. The Dutch had invented and perfected the snorkel, and they had offered the technology to the U.S. Navy, which rejected the offer. After invading the Netherlands in May 1940, the Germans took the technology and incorporated it into their submarines late in World War II. The U.S. Navy took notice of the German use of the snorkel and began to research a U.S. version. Operating from Fort Lauderdale, Florida, R-6 tested the first U.S.-made snorkel in August 1945. There is only one known set of photographs of the installation and configuration of the snorkel aboard R-6. Upon completion of trials of the snorkel, it  was removed.

In August 1945, R-6 and operated off Florida in the Port Everglades-Key West area. She decommissioned at Key West on 27 September 1945 and was struck from the Naval Vessel Register on 11 October 1945. She was sold for scrap to Macey O. Scott, Miami, Florida, in March 1946.

References

Footnotes

Bibliography
 Hinman, Charles R., and Douglas E. Campbell, . The Submarine Has No Friends: Friendly Fire Incidents Involving U.S. Submarines During World War II. Syneca Research Group, Inc., 2019. .

External links

United States R-class submarines
World War II submarines of the United States
Ships built in Quincy, Massachusetts
1919 ships
United States submarine accidents
Maritime incidents in 1919
Maritime incidents in 1921
Maritime incidents in March 1943
Friendly fire incidents of World War II